March of the Bastards is the third studio album by hard rock band Shaman's Harvest. It was released on August 8, 2006.

Track listing
 "Home (Part I)" – 2:03
 "The Lorax" – 3:10
 "March Of The Bastards" – 4:18
 "The Offering" – 4:49
 "Drawn By The Sirens" – 3:48
 "Waiting For The Animal" – 4:39
 "Sequoia" – 4:10
 "Halon" – 3:54
 "The Anvil" – 4:00
 "Home (Part III)" – 4:16
 "Destination Nowhere" – 3:14

References

2006 albums
Shaman's Harvest albums